Gian Croci (born 4 January 1998) is an Argentine professional footballer who plays as a centre-back for Argentino de Quilmes.

Career
Croci first appeared on a first-team teamsheet for Chacarita Juniors in March 2017, as he was unused in a home loss to Nueva Chicago. A week later, on 15 March, Croci made his professional debut in Primera B Nacional after playing the final eleven minutes in a goalless draw with Villa Dálmine.

Career statistics
.

References

External links

1998 births
Living people
People from Morón Partido
Argentine footballers
Association football defenders
Primera Nacional players
Argentine Primera División players
Chacarita Juniors footballers
Club Atlético Puerto Nuevo players
Argentino de Quilmes players
Sportspeople from Buenos Aires Province